Romanians in Finland are immigrants from Romania residing in Finland.

Migration
Eastern European Roma started arriving in Finland in 2007, when Romania and Bulgaria joined the EU. Many of the Romanian Roma in the Helsinki region are from Valea Seacă. Most of them beg and sell the Iso Numero magazine.

Employment
Roughly 200 Romanians and Bulgarians are in the police force in Helsinki.

Demographics
1.64% speak Finnish, 0.47% speak Swedish and the rest 97.89% speak other languages.

Distribution
The regions with the most Romanians are Uusimaa (2,019, 0.12%), Southwest Finland (784, 0.16%) and Åland (478, 1.60%).

Notable Finnish people of Romanian descent

 Tomi Petrescu, football player
 George de Godzinsky, composer and conductor
 Maria Lund, actress and singer-songwriter
 Veera Florica Rajala, lawyer and candidate in Helsinki municipal elections 2021

See also 
 Finland–Romania relations

References

Ethnic groups in Finland
Finnish people of Romanian descent
Finland